Feng is a multimedia streaming server compliant with IETF standards for real-time streaming of multimedia content over IP networks. Feng implements Real Time Streaming Protocol (RTSP) and Real-time Transport Protocol / RTP Control Protocol (RTP/RTCP). It supports the RTP Profile for Audio and Video Conferences with Minimal Control.

Feng is part of the LScube project, supported by the Internet Media Group at the Politecnico di Torino. It is released under the LGPL v2.1.

See also

Comparison of streaming media systems
RTP audio video profile

References

Streaming media systems